The Stade Jlidi is a multi-use stadium in Zarzis, Tunisia.  It is currently used by football team Espérance Sportive de Zarzis.  The stadium holds 7,000 people.

Zarzis Jlidi